Franklin County Memorial Hall, also known simply as Memorial Hall, is an office building, multi-use facility, and memorial for war dead in Downtown Columbus, Ohio. The building is best-known today as the headquarters of Franklin County Public Health.

Uses
The building currently holds the offices of Franklin County Public Health (the county's health department), Franklin County Veterans Services, and still retains a war memorial. The building was built from 1905 to 1906 by local architect Frank Packard. The building features a 4,200-seat auditorium, which was the second largest in the United States behind Madison Square Gardens when it was completed. The building has been used to host a variety of events:

 Musical events that included Rudolph Valentino, Paul Whitman and the Vienna Boys Choir
 Large church events
 Speaking events for William Jennings Brian, Homer Rodeheaver and DeWolfe Hopper
 Sporting events
 High school graduations
 Political and religious debates
 Columbus Philharmonic Orchestra (1941-1949)
 Radio shows in the early 20th century

It was home to the Franklin County Historical Society, which operated the Franklin County Museum of History here. The historical society also created the museum COSI (the Center of Science and Industry). COSI operated out of Memorial Hall from 1964 to 1999 before it relocated to its current space in Franklinton.

Gallery

References

Further reading

 

1906 establishments in Ohio
Buildings in downtown Columbus, Ohio
Culture of Columbus, Ohio
Office buildings completed in 1906
Office buildings in Columbus, Ohio
Broad Street (Columbus, Ohio)